Bangkok Haunted is a 2001 Thai horror anthology film directed by Oxide Pang and Pisut Praesangeam. It consists of three ghost stories, as told by three people sitting around in a darkened Bangkok bar.

Premise

'"Legend of the Drum'"
An antiques dealer discovers that a dancer's musical spirit possesses an old drum in her shop.

"Black Magic Woman"
A lonely young woman is given an aphrodisiac perfume that is extracted from corpses.

"Revenge"
A police cadet searches for the truth behind a girl's suicide by hanging.

Cast
Pimsiree Pimsee as Pagar
Pramote Seangsorn		
Dawan Singha-Wee as Pan
Kalyanut Sriboonrueng as Kanya
Pete Thong-Jeur as Nop

Release
At the time of its release in Thailand, Bangkok Haunted was the second-biggest grossing Thai horror film since Nang Nak in 1999.

The film was screened at the London Thai Film Festival on October 13, 2002.

Reception
Variety critic Derek Elley noted the film's atmospheric stylistic touches and technique, saying the first segment, Legend of the Drum was the strongest in terms of storytelling. Black Magic Woman is "largely an excuse for soft-porn sequences between some yucky shocks", Elley wrote. He said Revenge has weak plot development and had an over-reliance on "flashy effects".

Home media
Bangkok Haunted was released on Region 2 DVD on March 24, 2003 by Tartan Video and on Region 1 DVD July 26, 2005 by Panik House Entertainment.

Sequels
In the Philippines, the unrelated 2003 film The Unborn was released as Bangkok Haunted 2: The Unborn on August 18, 2004. The 2009 film Haunted Universities was also released in some territories as Bangkok Haunted 3.

References

External links

2001 films
Films directed by Oxide Pang
Thai horror anthology films
Thai horror films
Thai ghost films
RS Film films
Thai supernatural horror films